The Ethiopia–Somaliland border is almost as long as the one Ethiopia shares with Somalia, and Somaliland offers a buffer to Ethiopia against Al-Shabaab attack. Villages like Aleybedey are remote that lies to the border, and have semi-arid with a short rainy season, receiving about 650 millimeters of rain per year. Like Somalia, this border enjoyed vibrant economic interactions conducted by ethnically homogeneous Somalis.

The 2010 Ayn clashes saw Somaliland forces engage Dulbahante clan militia in the Buuhoodle district.  The battle was prompted by Ethiopian troops seizing a truck belonging to locals in Buuhoodle, sparking a response from residents and Ethiopian retaliatory attack on Buuhoodle and a Somaliland attack upon Widhwidh. More clashes were reported to have occurred near Widhwidh on 19 July 2010.

See also

 Ethiopia–Somalia border
 Somalia–Somaliland border
 Administrative divisions of Somaliland
 Regions of Somaliland
 Districts of Somaliland

References

 
Somaliland
Borders of Somaliland
International borders
Ethiopia–Somaliland relations